George Wesley Buchanan (December 25, 1921 – 2019) was an American biblical scholar who was a Professor of New Testament at Wesley Theological Seminary in Washington, D.C. He was on the Editorial Advisory Board of the Biblical Archaeology Review.

Life 
Buchanan was ordained an elder in the United Methodist Church and pastored churches for fourteen years.

Education 
Buchanan earned his B.A. from Simpson College, his B.D. from Garrett-Evangelical Theological Seminary, his M.A. from Northwestern University, and his Ph.D. from Drew University.

He was the recipient of several research grants: Horowitz Fellow, Scheuer Fellow, Rosenstiel Fellow, Association of Theological Schools Fellow, and Society of Biblical Literature Fellow. He also was awarded with Alumni Achievement Award by Simpson College.

Academic work 
From 1960 to 1990 he worked as a professor at Wesley Theological Seminary, where he was appointed Professor Emeritus.

G. W. Buchanan was an author or editor of several books and was on the Editorial Committee and Editorial Advisory Board of the Biblical Archaeology Review.

He has also collaborated at Logos Bible Software with, among other works, the George Wesley Buchanan Collection (9 vols.), where he is placed as a biblical scholar, one of the main defenders of intertextual criticism and one of the best Bible scholars of the 20th century.

Publications
 
 
 
  The English title does not correspond to any work by Reimarius in either German or English Wikipedia.

References

External links
 https://www.loc.gov/catdir/bios/random056/72076127.html

1921 births
2019 deaths
American biblical scholars
Wesley Theological Seminary
Methodist theologians